The 2010–11 Welsh Alliance League, known as the Lock Stock Welsh Alliance League for sponsorship reasons, is the 27th season of the Welsh Alliance League, which for the first time consists of two divisions: the third and fourth levels of the Welsh football pyramid.

There are sixteen teams in Division 1 and eleven teams in Division 2, with the champions of Division 1 promoted to the Cymru Alliance and the bottom team relegated to Division 2. In Division 2, the champions, and runners-up are promoted to Division 1.

The season began on 13 August 2010 and concluded on 11 May 2011 with Conwy United as Division 1 champions, Llanberis were relegated to Division 2. In Division 2, Caernarfon Wanderers were champions with Bodedern Athletic as runners-up.

Division 1

Teams 
Rhydymwyn were champions in the previous season and were promoted to the Cymru Alliance and replaced by Holyhead Hotspur, Bethesda Athletic, Denbigh Town, Llanfairpwll and Caernarfon Town who were all relegated from the Cymru Alliance.

Blaenau Ffestiniog Amateur, Llandyrnog United, Nantlle Vale, Amlwch Town and Halkyn United were relegated to the newly formed Division 2.

Grounds and locations

League table

Results

Division 2

Teams 
Last season bottom 5 teams: Blaenau Ffestiniog Amateur, Llandyrnog United, Nantlle Vale, Amlwch Town and Halkyn United were relegated and joining them to form the new Division 2 were Bodedern Athletic, Caernarfon Wanderers, Connah's Quay Town, Gaerwen, Greenfield and Penmaenmawr Phoenix.

Grounds and locations

League table

Results

References

External links
 Welsh Alliance League

Welsh Alliance League seasons
3